The 2015 Dutch Open Grand Prix will be the third grand prix and grand prix gold tournament of the 2015 BWF Grand Prix and Grand Prix Gold. The tournament will be held in Topsportcentrum, Almere, Netherlands October 6–11, 2015 and had a total purse of $50,000.

Men's singles

Seeds

  Marc Zwiebler (withdrew)
  Rajiv Ouseph (withdrew)
  Ajay Jayaram (champion)
  B. Sai Praneeth (second round)
  Scott Evans (withdrew)
  Zulfadli Zulkiffli (second round)
  Andre Kurniawan Tedjono (first round)
  Misha Zilberman (first round)
  R. M. V. Gurusaidutt (quarter-final)
  Pablo Abian (second round)
  Vladimir Malkov (withdrew)
  Raul Must (final)
  Thomas Rouxel (second round)
  Anand Pawar (first round)
  Emil Holst (semi-final)
  Joachim Persson (quarter-final)

Finals

Top half

Section 1

Section 2

Section 3

Section 4

Bottom half

Section 5

Section 6

Section 7

Section 8

Women's singles

Seeds

  Zhang Beiwen (withdrew)
  Beatriz Corrales (withdrew)
  Karin Schnaase (final)
  Iris Wang (quarter-final)
	
  Kirsty Gilmour (champion)
  Hsu Ya-ching (semi-final)
  Rong Schafer (second round)
  Linda Zetchiri (quarter-final)

Finals

Top half

Section 1

Section 2

Bottom half

Section 3

Section 4

Men's doubles

Seeds

  Marcus Ellis / Chris Langridge (withdrew)
  Manu Attri / B. Sumeeth Reddy (final)
  Adam Cwalina / Przemyslaw Wacha (second round)
  Michael Fuchs / Johannes Schoettler (quarter-final)
  Max Schwenger / Josche Zurwonne (quarter-final)
  Baptiste Careme / Ronan Labar (first round)
  Koo Kien Keat / Tan Boon Heong (champion)
  Pranaav Jerry Chopra / Akshay Dewalkar (first round)

Finals

Top half

Section 1

Section 2

Bottom half

Section 3

Section 4

Women's doubles

Seeds

  Eefje Muskens / Selena Piek (final)
  Gabriela Stoeva / Stefani Stoeva (champion)
  Johanna Goliszewski / Carla Nelte (semi-final)
  Heather Olver / Lauren Smith (quarter-final)

Finals

Top half

Section 1

Section 2

Bottom half

Section 3

Section 4

Mixed doubles

Seeds

  Michael Fuchs / Birgit Michels (quarter-final)
  Jacco Arends / Selena Piek (semi-final)
  Danny Bawa Chrisnanta / Vanessa Neo Yu Yan (quarter-final)
  Ronan Labar / Emilie Lefel (champion)
  Sudket Prapakamol / Saralee Thoungthongkam (final)
  Robert Blair /  Pia Zebadiah Bernadeth (quarter-final)
  Toby Ng / Alex Bruce (quarter-final)
  Vitalij Durkin / Nina Vislova (first round)

Finals

Top half

Section 1

Section 2

Bottom half

Section 3

Section 4

References

Dutch Open (badminton)
BWF Grand Prix Gold and Grand Prix
Open Grand Prix
Dutch Open Grand Prix
Dutch Open Grand Prix
Sports competitions in Almere